Oakley, North Carolina may refer to :

 Oakley, Buncombe County, North Carolina, a populated place in Asheville in Buncombe County, North Carolina
 Oakley, Pitt County, North Carolina, a populated place in Pitt County, North Carolina